Andyrossia is an extinct genus of wasp known from the Late Cretaceous Weald Clay of southern England, containing a single species, Andyrossia joyceae. It was first named by Rasnitsyn and Jarzembowski in 1998 as Arossia; this was later realised to be a junior homonym of a barnacle subgenus containing Concavus panamensis, and was replaced by the name Andyrossia in 2000.

References

Stephanoidea
Prehistoric Hymenoptera genera
Cretaceous insects
Prehistoric insects of Europe
Hymenoptera of Europe